Union Parish (French: Paroisse de l'Union) is a parish located in the north central section of the U.S. state of Louisiana. As of the 2020 census, the population was 21,107. The parish seat is Farmerville. The parish was created on March 13, 1839, from a section of Ouachita Parish. Its boundaries have changed four times since then (in 1845, 1846, 1867, and 1873, respectively).

Union Parish is part of the Monroe, LA Metropolitan Statistical Area.

Geography

Geographically north central Louisiana, Union Parish more closely resembles Lincoln Parish, to which Union is deeply tied culturally, politically, and educationally.  Union Parish, along with Lincoln Parish to the southwest and Union County, Arkansas to the north, form the eastern boundary of the Ark-La-Tex region.

Major highways
  U.S. Highway 63
  U.S. Highway 167
  Louisiana Highway 2
  Louisiana Highway 15
  Louisiana Highway 33

Adjacent parishes and counties
 Union County, Arkansas (northwest)
 Ashley County, Arkansas (northeast)
 Morehouse Parish (east)
 Ouachita Parish (southeast)
 Lincoln Parish (southwest)
 Claiborne Parish (west)

National protected areas
 D'Arbonne National Wildlife Refuge (part)
 Upper Ouachita National Wildlife Refuge (part)

Demographics

2020 census

As of the 2020 United States census, there were 21,107 people, 7,582 households, and 4,899 families residing in the parish.

2000 census
As of the census of 2000, there were 22,803 people, 8,857 households, and 6,412 families residing in the parish. There were 10,873 housing units at an average density of 12 per square mile (5/km2). The racial makeup of the parish was 69.79% White, 27.95% Black or African American, 0.19% Native American, 0.26% Asian, 0.05% Pacific Islander, 1.26% from other races, and 0.50% from two or more races. 2.02% of the population were Hispanic or Latino of any race.

There were 8,857 households, out of which 31.30% had children under the age of 18 living with them, 55.30% were married couples living together, 13.70% had a female householder with no husband present, and 27.60% were non-families. 24.90% of all households were made up of individuals, and 11.00% had someone living alone who was 65 years of age or older. The average household size was 2.52 and the average family size was 3.01.

In the parish the population was spread out, with 25.70% under the age of 18, 9.10% from 18 to 24, 26.50% from 25 to 44, 23.80% from 45 to 64, and 14.90% who were 65 years of age or older. The median age was 37 years. For every 100 females there were 94.50 males. For every 100 females age 18 and over, there were 90.90 males.

The median income for a household in the parish was $29,061, and median income of a family was $36,035. Males had a median income of $30,494 versus $21,070 for females. The per capita income for the parish was $14,819. About 14.30% of families and 18.60% of the population were below the poverty line, including 25.60% of those under age 18 and 17.70% of those age 65 or over.

Politics
Located in far northern Louisiana next to the Arkansas state line, Union Parish is heavily Republican in most competitive elections, particularly at the presidential level, last voting for a Democratic presidential nominee in 1952 when Adlai Stevenson received 52% of the vote. In the most recent election in 2020, incumbent President Donald Trump received 8,407 votes (75.1 percent) of the parish total to 2,654 (23.7 percent) for former Vice President Joe Biden.

School
Residents are assigned to Union Parish Public Schools.

Law enforcement

The Union Parish Sheriff's Office is the primary law enforcement agency of Union Parish, Louisiana. It is headquartered in Farmerville. The current Sheriff  of Union Parish is Dusty Gates, who was first sworn as the sheriff following long time Sheriff Bob Buckley's death in September 2013.

Border monument
In 1931, a monument was erected at the Union Parish border with Union County, Arkansas. In 1975, State Representative Louise B. Johnson passed a law to refurbish the monument. The completed restoration was unveiled in 2009.

Communities

Towns 
 Bernice
 Farmerville (parish seat and largest municipality)
 Marion

Villages
 Conway
 Downsville
 Junction City
 Lillie
 Spearsville

Unincorporated communities
 Alabama Landing
 Oakland
 Ouachita City
 Point
 Shiloh

Notable people
Two Louisiana governors came from the Shiloh Community in Union Parish:
 William Wright Heard, 1900–1904
 Ruffin Pleasant, 1916-1920

Two Arkansas governors were natives of Union Parish:
 George Washington Donaghey, Governor of Arkansas from 1909 to 1913
 Tom Jefferson Terral, Governor of Arkansas from 1925 to 1927

Other Union Parish residents have included:
 Lonnie O. Aulds, state representative from 1968 to 1972
 George Washington Bolton (1841-1931), state representative from 1888 to 1896 from Alexandria
 Jay McCallum - Chief Judge of the Louisiana 3rd Judicial District Court
 B. R. Patton, state senator
 Robert Roberts Jr. state representative and state district judge
 James Peyton Smith, state representative
 Lee Emmett Thomas, Speaker of the Louisiana House of Representative

See also

 National Register of Historic Places listings in Union Parish, Louisiana
 Big Creek (Union Parish, LA)

Sources
Many facts concerning events in early Union Parish history come from the conveyance, probate, and lawsuit records on file in the Union Parish courthouse, as well as records of the United States Land Offices available in the National Archives. Other sources include:

1) Williams, E. Russ, Jr., Spanish Poste d’Ouachita: The Ouachita Valley in Colonial Louisiana 1783–1804, and Early American Statehood, 1804–1820, Williams Genealogical Publications, Monroe, LA, 1995.

2) Williams, E. Russ, Jr., Encyclopedia of Individuals and Founding Families of the Ouachita Valley of Louisiana From 1785 to 1850: Organized into Family Groups with Miscellaneous Materials on Historical Events, Places, and Other Important Topics, Part Oe A – K, Williams Genealogical and Historical Publications, Monroe, LA, 1996.

3) Williams, E. Russ, Jr., Encyclopedia of Individuals and Founding Families of the Ouachita Valley of Louisiana From 1785 to 1850: Organized into Family Groups with Miscellaneous Materials on Historical Events, Places, and Other Important Topics, Part Two L – O, Williams Genealogical and Historical Publications, Monroe, LA, 1997.

4) Williams, Max Harrison, Union Parish (Louisiana) Historical Records: Police Jury Minutes, 1839–1846, D’Arbonne Research and Publishing Co., Farmerville, LA, 1993.

References

 
Louisiana parishes
Parishes in Monroe, Louisiana metropolitan area
1839 establishments in Louisiana
Populated places established in 1839